The Connecticut Association of Schools and the Connecticut Interscholastic Athletic Conference (CIAC) is the governing body for secondary school athletics and other interscholastic competition in the state of Connecticut.

Sports offered

Fall

Cross Country
Boys Football
Girls Field Hockey
Soccer
Girls Swimming
Girls Volleyball

Winter

Basketball
Boys Ice hockey
Indoor Track
Boys Swimming
Wrestling
Cheerleading

Spring

Boys Baseball
Girls Softball
Golf
Lacrosse
Tennis
Outdoor Track
Boys Volleyball
Boys Rugby Union

Conferences
Berkshire League
Capitol Region Athletic League
Central Connecticut Conference
Connecticut Technical Conference
Eastern Connecticut Conference
Fairfield County Interscholastic Athletic Conference
Naugatuck Valley League
North Central Connecticut Conference
Shoreline Conference
Southern Connecticut Conference
South West Conference

See also 
 List of high schools in Connecticut
 NFHS

References 

The CIAC Story. Retrieved 2006-04-30.
"Connecticut Interscholastic Athletic Conference Handbook 2005-2006." CAS-CIAC. 2005. Connecticut Association of Schools - Connecticut Interscholastic Athletic Conference.

External links
Official website

Sports in Connecticut
Education in Connecticut
High school sports associations in the United States
Sports organizations established in 1921
1921 establishments in Connecticut